A Thousand Faces is a dance theatre piece by British dancer Amina Khayyam.

Cast
Iris Chan: dancer
Lucy Teed: dancer
Amina Khayyam: dancer
Tarun Jasani: music

Tour
A Thousand Faces premiered mac in Birmingham on 27 November 2015.

Critical response
Whatsonstage.com called it "a bold dance piece".

References

External links

2015 plays
British plays
English-language plays